The Decatur County School District is a public school district in Decatur County, Georgia, United States, based in Bainbridge. It serves the communities of Attapulgus, Bainbridge, Brinson, and Climax.

History
In 2021 the district will change grade alignment.

Schools
The Decatur County School District has one elementary school, one middle school, two primary schools and one high school.

High school
Bainbridge High School

Middle school
Bainbridge Middle School

Elementary/Primary schools
 Hutto Elementary School

 West Bainbridge Primary School

 Jones Wheat Primary School

Other
New Beginnings Learning Center - Will move to Potter Street facility (for grades 6-12)

References

External links
Decatur County School District
Attapulgus High School historical marker
Cyrene Institute historical marker
First Flint River Baptist Normal Institute historical marker
Hutto School historical marker
Union Normal School historical marker

School districts in Georgia (U.S. state)
Education in Decatur County, Georgia